Héctor Biassini (born 4 October 1951) is an Argentine rower. He competed in the men's eight event at the 1972 Summer Olympics.

References

1951 births
Living people
Argentine male rowers
Olympic rowers of Argentina
Rowers at the 1972 Summer Olympics
Place of birth missing (living people)